Renaissance are an English progressive rock band from London. Formed in spring 1969, the group originally consisted of lead vocalist Jane Relf, guitarist and vocalist Keith Relf, bassist Louis Cennamo, drummer and vocalist Jim McCarty, and keyboardist John Hawken. The band has been through many lineup changes, and currently includes lead vocalist Annie Haslam (since 1971), guitarist and vocalist Mark Lambert (from 1985 to 1987, and since 2015), keyboardist Rave Tesar (since 2001), drummer and vocalist Frank Pagano (since 2009), keyboardist and vocalist Geoffrey Langley (since 2016), and bassist and vocalist John Arbo (since 2018).

History

1969–1987
Renaissance were formed in the spring of 1969 by former Yardbirds members Keith Relf (guitar, harmonica, vocals) and Jim McCarty (drums, percussion, vocals), who enlisted Relf's sister Jane on lead vocals and percussion, session bassist Louis Cennamo, and former Nashville Teens keyboardist John Hawken. After releasing just one self-titled album, however, the group's lineup fell apart – McCarty was first to leave due to illness, followed by Keith Relf and Cennamo. Hawken and Jane Relf completed Illusion with vocalist Terry Crowe, guitarist Michael Dunford, bassist Neil Korner and drummer Terry Slade. By October, Hawken and Slade had also left the group. They were replaced by John Tout and Anne-Marie "Binky" Cullom, respectively. Annie Haslam took over from Cullom in January 1971.

A few months into 1971, the band's manager Miles Copeland III decided to rebuild Renaissance around Haslam and Tout. Crowe departed and Korner was replaced a number of times, starting with Danny McCulloch, followed by Frank Farrell and later John Wetton. In 1972, Dunford stepped back from performing duty and was replaced by Mick Parsons, Ginger Dixon took over from Slade, and Wetton made way for Jon Camp. Just before recording for the band's next album Prologue began, Parsons died in a car accident and was replaced by Rob Hendry, while Dixon was replaced with Terry Sullivan. Hendry was replaced by Pete Finberg for a string of tour dates, before Dunford rejoined the band in time to record Ashes Are Burning. This lineup remained stable for seven years, releasing five more albums.

After the tour in promotion of 1979's Azure d'Or, Tout and Renaissance parted ways by mutual consent. In response, Sullivan also chose to leave the band. The group briefly disbanded, but returned with Camera Camera in 1981 and Time-Line in 1983, which featured session musicians Peter Barron (drums) and Peter Gosling (keyboards). In 1983, the band expanded again with the addition of drummer Gavin Harrison and keyboardist Mike Taylor, although they were replaced by Greg Carter and Raphael Rudd, respectively, a year later. Camp left in 1985, at which point Haslam and Dunford opted to tour as an acoustic quintet with Rudd, bassist Mark Lambert and percussionist Charles Descarfino. Renaissance eventually disbanded after a final touring cycle which ended in June 1987.

1998 onwards
Haslam and Dunford reformed Renaissance in 1998 with former drummer Sullivan and keyboardist Tout, beginning work on new album Tuscany the next year. After the first recording session, Tout was replaced by Mickey Simmonds, who completed the rest of the album. Bass was recorded by guest contributors Roy Wood and Alex Caird. For the album's promotional tour, the group added bassist David J. Keyes and second keyboardist Rave Tesar, before they disbanded for a second time in 2002. In August 2009, Haslam and Dunford announced that Renaissance would be returning for a third time, touring in commemoration of the band's 40th anniversary. The group's lineup for the tour included returning members Keyes and Tesar, as well as drummer Frank Pagano and second keyboardist Tom Brislin.

By October 2010, Brislin had been replaced by Jason Hart. On 20 November 2012, Dunford died after suffering a cerebral hemorrhage. Despite the loss of a central member, Haslam assured that Renaissance would continue, and the following February it was announced that Ryche Chlanda would take over as the band's guitarist. Grandine il vento, a new studio album recorded prior to Dunford's death, was released a few months later. In 2015, Chlanda, Keyes and Hart were replaced by Mark Lambert, Leo Traversa and Tom Brislin, respectively. The following year, Brislin was replaced again by Geoffrey Langley. Charles Descarfino replaced Pagano in 2017 for an orchestral tour, although by 2018 the drummer had returned to the band. Later in the year, John Arbo replaced Traversa on bass.

Members

Current

Former

Timeline

Lineups

References

External links
Renaissance official website

Renaissance
Renaissance (band) members